Actinocamax (from  , 'ray' and   'stake') is a genus of belemnite, an extinct group of cephalopods.

See also

 Belemnite
 List of belemnites

References

Belemnites
Cretaceous cephalopods of Europe
Late Cretaceous cephalopods of North America